Germán Rojas Gallego (born 10 April 1979), sometimes known simply as Germán, is a retired Spanish footballer who played as a central defender.

Club career
Born in Lepe, Huelva, Andalusia, Rojas graduated from neighbouring Sevilla FC's youth setup. He made his senior debuts in the 1998–99 campaign, in Segunda División B.

On 9 April 2000 Rojas made his first team – and La Liga – debut, starting and being sent off in a 0–3 away loss against Málaga CF. He appeared in three further matches with the main squad during the season, ending with relegation.

In the 2000 summer Rojas moved to another reserve team, Atlético Madrid B also in the third level. An undisputed starter, he played in more than 100 matches for the Colchoneros during his three-year spell.

In January 2005, after a stint with CD Badajoz, Rojas moved to Córdoba CF in Segunda División. He only appeared rarely in 2004–05 (which ended in relegation), but was a starter in 2005–06.

In July 2006 Rojas joined Alicante CF also in the third division. He appeared in 38 matches during his second season, as the Valencian returned to the second level after a 51-year absence.

In June 2009, after suffering relegation back to the third level, Rojas moved to Benidorm CF. He subsequently resumed his career in the same division but also in Tercera División, representing CD San Roque de Lepe (two stints) and AD Ceuta.

References

External links
 
 Futbolme profile  
 
  at La Preferente
  at Footballdatabase

1979 births
Living people
Sportspeople from the Province of Huelva
Spanish footballers
Footballers from Andalusia
Association football defenders
La Liga players
Segunda División players
Segunda División B players
Tercera División players
Sevilla Atlético players
Sevilla FC players
Atlético Madrid B players
CD Badajoz players
Córdoba CF players
Alicante CF footballers
Benidorm CF footballers
CD San Roque de Lepe footballers
AD Ceuta footballers